Georges Ista (12 November 1874 – 6 January 1939) was a Belgian writer known for his work in the Walloon language.  A native of Liège, he died in Paris.  He wrote a number of plays.

Works
 

1874 births
1939 deaths
Writers from Liège
Belgian writers in Walloon